Jack Spencer may refer to:
Jack Spencer (1900s rugby league), English rugby league footballer
Jack Spencer (rugby league, born 1920) (1920–1998), Australian rugby league footballer for the Balmain Tigers
Jack Spencer (rugby league, born 1990), English rugby league player for the Wests Tigers
Jack Spencer (footballer) (1920–1966), English Association football (soccer) player
Jack Spencer (basketball) (1923–2004), American college basketball coach

See also
Jack Spencer-Churchill (1880–1947), English military officer and brother of Winston Churchill
John Spencer (disambiguation)